Ruth Zechlin (22 June 1926 – 4 August 2007) was a German composer.

Life
Ruth Oschatz was born in Grosshartmannsdorf, where she began piano lessons at the age of five years, and wrote her first composition at the age of seven. From 1943 to 1949 she studied music theory with Johann Nepomuk David and Wilhelm Weismann, church music and organ with Karl Straube and Günther Ramin and piano with Rudolf Fischer and Anton Rohden at the Music Academy in Leipzig. After she completed the state exam, she worked at the academy for a year as a lecturer and also worked as a deputy organist at the Nikolai Church in Leipzig.

In 1951 she married pianist Dieter Zechlin, and the marriage lasted until 1972 when the couple divorced. Zechlin gained lectureship in music theory at the German College of Music in Berlin in 1969, where she taught harpsichord and studied harmony, counterpoint, form, orchestration and composition. After 1970 she was professor of composition at the Academy of Arts and taught a master class in composition. After her retirement in 1986, Zechlin continued teaching as a visiting professor. Beginning in 1990, she was a member of the DDR Academy of Arts, Berlin and served as vice president of that organization.  From 1997 she was a member of the Free Academy of the Arts of Mannheim, and in 1998 became an honorary member of the German Music Council.

Zechlin composed works for instrumental and vocal performance and stage works, as well as music for radio plays, documentaries and TV movies. She was an active conductor, harpsichordist and organist, and  received numerous awards for her work. Her students included Gerd Domhardt, Thomas Böttger and Georg Katzer.

Death
Ruth Zechlin died in Munich in 2007, aged 81, and her estate is owned by the State Library in Berlin.

Awards
1955: Silver Medal at the World Festival of Youth and Students in Moscow for the Sonatine for flute and piano
1962 Goethe Prize of the City of Berlin
1965: Prize of the GDR
1968: Hanns Eisler Prize for "Reflections on a piano piece by Prokofiev for piano and chamber ensemble"
1968: Critics Award of the City of Berlin for Reineke Fuchs, opera for actors
1975: National Prize of East Germany for Organ I
1982: National Prize of East Germany for the orchestral works
1996 Artist Award of the City of Heidelberg
1997: Merit, 1st Class of Merit of the Federal Republic of Germany
2001: Bavarian Maximilian Order for Science and Art

Works
Reineke Fuchs, Opera (1968)
La Vita, Ballet (1985)
Die Reise, Chamber Opera (1992, premiered 1998)
In Memorian Witold Lutosławski for viola solo (1995)
Music for Orchestra (1980)
Requiem for G. Domhardt for orchestra (1998)
Three Songs on Texts of Hildegard of Bingen (chamber music) (1998)

References

External links
Ruth Zechlin website

1926 births
2007 deaths
People from Mittelsachsen
National Democratic Party of Germany (East Germany) politicians
Christian Democratic Union (East Germany) politicians
German classical pianists
German women pianists
Women classical composers
German opera composers
20th-century classical pianists
20th-century German composers
20th-century classical composers
21st-century classical composers
21st-century German composers
Women opera composers
Academic staff of the University of Music and Theatre Leipzig
Recipients of the National Prize of East Germany
Recipients of the Patriotic Order of Merit in bronze
Officers Crosses of the Order of Merit of the Federal Republic of Germany
Recipients of the Medal of Merit of the GDR
20th-century women composers
21st-century women composers
20th-century German women
21st-century German women
20th-century women pianists
21st-century women pianists